Homefield School (closed Feb. 10, 2005) was a school for boys and girls age four to 18 in Winkton, Dorset, England.

The school occupied a large, cream-painted building with a sign announcing "Sports Academy. Dorset Lawn Tennis Association School of the Year." Over the door was an inscription: "Ratione Non Vi" (By reason, not by force). There were 2 departments, Preparatory and Senior - the prep school was a self-contained unit with a play area.

Homefield had extensive playing fields overlooking farmland.

For years 7–11, subjects included the core subjects: English, Maths and Physical Education plus optional subjects: Art (Painting & Drawing), Art (Three Dimensional), Biology, Chemistry, Physics, Geography, Home Economics (Food), and Information Technology (Computers).

Closure
Homefield School closed permanently in January 2005.

External links
'We don't do posh'
schools in England and Wales

Schools in Christchurch, Dorset
Defunct schools in Bournemouth, Christchurch and Poole